Lucien is a male given name. It is the French form of Luciano or Latin Lucianus, patronymic of Lucius.

Lucien, Saint Lucien, or Saint-Lucien may also refer to:

People

Given name 
Lucien of Beauvais, Christian saint
Lucien, a band member of Delta-S
Lucien Bonaparte, brother of Napoleon
Lucien Bouchard, French-Canadian politician
Lucien Bourjeily, Lebanese writer and director
Lucien Carr, member of the original New York City circle of the Beat Generation
Lucien Dahdah, Lebanese politician
Lucien Macull Dominic de Silva (1893-1962), Sri Lankan Sinhala member of the Privy Council
Lucien Ginsburg, birth name of Serge Gainsbourg
Lucien Greaves, social activist and the spokesman and co-founder of The Satanic Temple
Lucien Jack, the real name of British singer Jack Lucien
Lucien Lagrange, a French-born, Chicago-based architect
Lucien Laurin, race horse trainer of Secretariat
Lucien Littlefield, an American actor in the silent film era (who later also appeared on television)
Lucien Reeberg, American football player
Lucien Revolucien, French hip-hop artist
Lucien Schmikale, German basketball player
Lucien Sciuto, Jewish writer and journalist
Lucian Truscott, U.S. Army General in World War II
Lucien Van Impe, cyclist, winner of the 1976 Tour de France
Lucien Leopold Harrigan known professionally as Jon Lucien, jazz and R&B singer

Fictional characters
Lucien Cramp in Cramp Twins
Lucien Debray in Dumas' novel The Count of Monte Cristo
Lucien Lachance in the video game The Elder Scrolls IV: Oblivion
Lucien Fairfax, the main antagonist in the video game Fable II
Lucien in The Sandman comic books
Lucien, recurrent character in Frank Margerin's comics
Lucien in the movie Amélie
Lucien in the MMORPG RuneScape
Lucien Mulholland in Mary Hoffman's Stravaganza series
Lucien Wilbanks in John Grisham's novels A Time to Kill and The Last Juror
Dr Lucien Blake in The Doctor Blake Mysteries
Lucien Lacombe in the movie Lacombe, Lucien
Lucien in the game Brawlhalla
Lucien Vanserra in Sarah J. Maas' A Court of Thorns and Roses
Lucian Connally in Longmire (TV series)
Luciann Blake in Luciann Blake: The Untold Story
Lucien Castle in The Originals
Lucien Antoine Hector Savinien de Ladon, Comte de Graçay in the Horatio Hornblower novels Flying Colours and Lord Hornblower.
Lucien Xu, a main character in female oriented visual novel phone game Mr Love: Queen's Choice
Milo Morbius, born Lucien Crown, main antagonist of the 2022 supernatural superhero film Morbius
 Luke Garroway, born Lucian Graymark, character from the Shadowhunters tv show

Places
Saint-Lucien, Eure-et-Loir, a commune in the Eure-et-Loir department, France
Saint-Lucien, Seine-Maritime, a commune in the Seine-Maritime department, France
Saint-Lucien, Quebec, a municipality in Quebec, Canada

See also
Lucień, a village in Poland
Lucien (band), Swedish rock band
Lucien (restaurant), a French bistro in New York
Lucian
Luciano (disambiguation)
Lucius
"Luck of Lucien", a song from the 1990 album People's Instinctive Travels and the Paths of Rhythm by A Tribe Called Quest

French masculine given names